Nigel Starmer-Smith (born 25 December 1944, Cheltenham) is a former international rugby union player, British rugby journalist and commentator.

He was educated at Magdalen College School, Oxford and University College, Oxford. After university, Starmer-Smith briefly trained at a shipping management firm before choosing to focus on rugby.

Playing career
Starmer-Smith played scrum-half for Oxford University (as a student at University College, Oxford) before progressing to senior club, Harlequins. He retired in 1975-76. During the 1966-67 season, while still at Oxford he was selected to play for British rugby's foremost invitational team the Barbarians. In 1969 he was selected to play for England against a touring South Africa side.

Non-playing career and journalism
In the late 1960s he taught geography at Epsom College.

He edited Rugby World magazine and for 15 years introduced Rugby Special for the BBC. He has also commentated on Olympic hockey for the BBC but had to make way for Barry Davies for the 1988 Olympic Final.

During the 2003 World Cup in Australia, Starmer-Smith commentated for ITV Sport's coverage.

Starmer-Smith was the lead television commentator on the IRB Sevens World Series and also lead columnist for the global rugby sevens portal, UR7s.com.

On the 28 March 2021 edition of the BBC Radio 5 Live breakfast show, his son revealed that Nigel had been suffering from frontotemporal dementia for a number of years and was living in a care home.

References

1944 births
Living people
Alumni of University College, Oxford
Barbarian F.C. players
British sports broadcasters
England international rugby union players
English rugby union commentators
English rugby union players
Harlequin F.C. players
Oxford University RFC players
People educated at Magdalen College School, Oxford
Rugby union players from Cheltenham
Surrey RFU players
People with frontotemporal dementia
Rugby union scrum-halves